Papyrus 84 (in the Gregory-Aland numbering), designated by 𝔓84, is a copy of the New Testament in Greek. It is a papyrus manuscript of the four Gospels. The surviving texts of Gospels are verses Mark 2:2-5,8-9; 6:30-31,33-34,36-37,39-41; John 5:5; 17:3,7-8.
The manuscript paleographically has been assigned to the 6th century.

 Text 
The Greek text of this codex probably is mixed with strong element of the Byzantine text-type. Aland placed it in Category III.

 Location 
It is currently housed at the Katholieke Universiteit Leuven Library (P. A. M. Khirbet Mird, Greek 1–3; formerly P. A. M. Khirbet Mird 4, 11, 26, 27).

See also 

 List of New Testament papyri
 Papyrus 83

References 

New Testament papyri
6th-century biblical manuscripts
Gospel of John papyri
Gospel of Mark papyri